The Constitutionalist Revolution of 1932 (sometimes also referred to as Paulista War or Brazilian Civil War) is the name given to the uprising of the population of the Brazilian state of São Paulo against the Brazilian Revolution of 1930 when Getúlio Vargas assumed the nation's presidency; Vargas was supported by the people, the military and the political elites of Minas Gerais, Rio Grande do Sul and Paraíba. The movement grew out of local resentment from the fact that Vargas ruled by decree, unbound by a Constitution, in a provisional government. The 1930 Revolution also affected São Paulo by eroding the autonomy that states enjoyed during the term of the 1891 Constitution and preventing the inauguration of the governor of São Paulo, Júlio Prestes, who had been elected president of Brazil in 1930, while simultaneously overthrowing President Washington Luís, who was governor of São Paulo from 1920 to 1924. These events marked the end of the First Brazilian Republic.

The Revolution's main goal was to press the provisional government headed by Getúlio Vargas to adopt and then abide by a new Constitution, since Júlio Prestes was kept from taking office. However, as the movement developed and resentment against Vargas and his revolutionary government grew deeper, it came to advocate the overthrow of the Federal Government, and it was even speculated that one of the Revolutionaries' goals was the secession of São Paulo from the Brazilian federation. However, it is noted that the separatist scenario was used as a guerrilla tactic by the Federal Government to turn the population in the rest of the country against the state of São Paulo, broadcasting the alleged separatist threat throughout the country. There is no evidence that the movement's commanders sought separatism.

The uprising began on July 9, 1932, after four protesting students were killed by government troops on May 23, 1932. On the wake of their deaths, a movement called MMDC (from the initials of the names of each of the four students killed: Martins, Miragaia, Dráusio and Camargo) started. A fifth victim, Alvarenga, was also shot that night, but died months later.

In a few months, the state of São Paulo rebelled against the federal government. Counting on the support of the political elites of two other powerful states, Minas Gerais and Rio Grande do Sul, the politicians from São Paulo expected a quick war. However, the expected support did not materialize, and São Paulo's revolt was militarily crushed on October 2, 1932. In total, there were 87 days of fighting (July 9 to October 4, 1932—with the last two days after the surrender of São Paulo), with a balance of 934 official deaths, though non-official estimates report up to 2,200 dead, and many cities in the state of São Paulo suffered damage due to fighting.

In spite of its military defeat, some of the movement's main demands were finally granted by Vargas afterwards: the appointment of a non-military state Governor, the election of a Constituent Assembly and, finally, the enactment of a new Constitution in 1934. However, the new Constitution was short-lived, as in 1937, amidst growing extremism on the left and right wings of the political spectrum, Vargas closed the National Congress and enacted another Constitution, which established the so-called Estado Novo after a coup d'état.

July 9 marks the beginning of the Revolution of 1932, and is a holiday and the most important civic date of the state of São Paulo. The Paulistas (as the inhabitants of São Paulo are known) consider the Revolution of 1932 as the greatest movement of its civic history. It was the first major revolt against the government of Getúlio Vargas.

Opposing forces
According to García de Gabiola, when the revolution began the Paulistas only swayed one of the 8 divisions of the Brazilian Army (the 2nd Division, based in São Paulo), and half of the Mixed Brigade based in the southern part of Mato Grosso. These forces were reinforced by the Força Pública Paulista (the military police of São Paulo state), and the MMDC militias. In all, there were some 11,000–15,000 men at the beginning of the conflict, later joined by thousands of volunteers. In fact, according to authors such as Hilton, São Paulo equipped some 40 battalions of volunteers, but García de Gabiola states that he had identified up to 80 of them, of some 300 men each. At the end, taking into account that in the São Paulo state armory's there were only between 15,000 and 29,000 rifles depending on the source, the Paulistas were never able to arm more than 35,000 men maximum. Additionally, the Paulistas had only 6 million cartridges, failing their attempts to acquire some additional 500 million, so, for an army of some 30,000 men fighting for 3 months, it represented a mere 4.4 cartridges a day per soldier. Brazil equipped approximately 100,000 men, but taking into account that a third of this amount never went to the front (they were kept to protect the rearguards and for security purposes in the other states), their numerical superiority was of some 2 to 1.

Course of the conflict
The main front was initially the eastern Paraíba Valley that led to Rio de Janeiro, then the capital of Brazil. The 2nd Division revolted and advanced against Rio de Janeiro, but was stopped dead by the loyal 1st Division based there under the command of General Góis Monteiro, on the border between the states of Rio de Janeiro and São Paulo. According to Hilton, General Tasso Fragoso, the chief of staff of the Brazilian Army, tried to oppose the deployment of the 1st Division in the valley, believing they were friendly to the rebels, but according to García de Gabiola he was likely just trying to protect the government based in Rio de Janeiro in case of a similar revolt happening there. In any case, Monteiro finally overruled Fragoso and the 1st Division was placed there just in time to block the Paulista advance. In the Paraíba, Góis Monteiro created the East Detachment, reaching some 34,000 men, against some 20,000 Paulistas, but after 3 months of trench warfare and despite advancing some 70 km, the government forces were still some 150 km  from the capital São Paulo when the war ended.

In the south of São Paulo state, the government forces created the South Detachment, made of the federal 3rd and 5th divisions, 3 cavalry divisions and the gaucho brigade of Rio Grande do Sul reaching 18,000 men against just 3-5,000 Paulistas depending on the date. The federals broke through the rebel defensive line in Itararé on July 17, producing the largest advance in the war, but they were still very far from São Paulo when the war ended. Finally, the decisive front was the Minas Gerais Front, that was only active after August 2. The 4th Federal Division, based in Minas Gerais, with the Police of Minas Gerais and other states' troops, broke through the rebel defensive line in Eleutério (a district of Itapira) on August 26, advancing some 50 km towards Campinas, adding 18,000 soldiers against some 7,000 Paulistas. The 4th Division was only 70 km from São Paulo. The Paulistas surrendered in October 2 to General Valdomiro Lima, uncle of Vargas' wife, Darci Vargas.

Naval Task Force and naval blockade of São Paulo
In the naval theater the Brazilian Navy had designated a naval task force to blockade São Paulo's main port, the Port of Santos, aiming to cut the only supply line of the rebels by sea.

On July 10 the destroyer Mato Grosso left the port of Rio de Janeiro. The next day, the cruiser Rio Grande do Sul, escorted by two destroyers, Pará and Sergipe, also left. To support the mission, the Naval Aviation sent three Savoia-Marchetti S-55A (numbers 1, 4 and 8) and two Martim PM (numbers 111 and 112) planes. These five planes left Galeão on July 12. All were provisionally based at the coves of the Island of São Sebastião, near the village of Vila Bela (current Ilhabela). The Navy also intended to send some Vought Corsair O2U-2A for Vila Bela, but the Naval Aviation did not trust them to operate as floatplanes from the coves of the island, so it decided to expand the small airstrip next to the village so that they could operate with landing gear.

In popular culture

The Revolution plays a key role in the setting of Peter Fleming's book Brazilian Adventure, an offbeat portrayal by a British man caught in the midst of the fighting.

Gallery

See also

 List of rebellions and revolutions in Brazil
 Paulista Revolt of 1924

Bibliography

Silva, Herculano. A Revolução Constitucionalista. Rio de Janeiro.  Civilização Brasileira Editora. 1932.

García de Gabiola,  Javier. 1932 São Paulo en Armas. Historia y Vida 535. October 2012. Barcelona.  Prisma Editorial. Planeta.

Hilton, Stanley.  A Guerra Civil Brasileira (The Brazilian Civil War).  Rio de Janeiro. Nova Fronteira, 1982.

References

20th-century revolutions
Revolutions in Brazil
Conflicts in 1932
1932 in Brazil
History of São Paulo (state)
20th century in São Paulo
Vargas Era